The Memphis Americans are professional indoor soccer teams based in the Memphis suburb of Southaven, Mississippi. They are the second team to use this name.  This version of the Americans play in the National Indoor Soccer League while the original Memphis Americans played in Memphis, Tennessee from 1981 to 1984 in the MISL at the Mid-South Coliseum. 

On April 29, 2021, the Memphis Americans were officially announced as a charter team in the new NISL to field both men's and women's teams. They now play at Landers Center in Southaven, Mississippi .

History

The Original Americans
In May 1981, the Christian group Athletes in Action, headed by former stand out soccer player Kyle Rote, Jr., purchased the financially troubled MISL team then known as the Hartford Hellions and moved the team to Memphis.  The team, renamed the Americans, played in Memphis through the end of the 1984 season before relocating to Las Vegas, for the  1984–85  season but retained the name "Americans". The team folded due to financial troubles at the end of the 1984-1985 season.

The Americans: Reborn
On April 29, 2021, the Memphis Americans were officially announced as a charter team in the new NISL to field both men's and women's team.

Year-by-year

Head coach
Corey Adamson

Assistant Coach
Bo Melson

Memphis Americans Men's Team

Memphis Americans Women's team

Arenas
 Landers Center , in Southaven, Mississippi

References

External links
Team Website

Sports in Southaven, Mississippi
Memphis metropolitan area
2021 establishments in Mississippi
Association football clubs established in 2021
Soccer clubs in Mississippi